Liliana Arigoni (born 6 March 1963) is an Argentine athlete. She competed in the women's high jump at the 1984 Summer Olympics.

References

External links
 

1963 births
Living people
Athletes (track and field) at the 1979 Pan American Games
Athletes (track and field) at the 1984 Summer Olympics
Argentine female high jumpers
Olympic athletes of Argentina
Place of birth missing (living people)
Pan American Games competitors for Argentina